Moussa Diarra (born 10 November 2000) is a French professional footballer who plays as a defender for  club Toulouse.

Club career
On 21 April 2019, Diarra signed his first professional contract with Toulouse. He made his professional debut with Toulouse in a 2–1 Coupe de la Ligue win over Chamois Niortais on 30 October 2019.

International career
Born in France, Diarra is of Malian descent. he was called up to the Mali national team for a set of friendlies in September 2022.

Honours
Toulouse
 Ligue 2: 2021–22

References

External links
 
 
 Toulouse FC Profile

2000 births
Living people
Footballers from Seine-Saint-Denis
French footballers
French sportspeople of Malian descent
Black French sportspeople
Association football defenders
Ligue 1 players
Ligue 2 players
Championnat National 3 players
Toulouse FC players